Cultus may refer to:
Cult (religious practice)
Cultus (stonefly), a genus of stoneflies
Cultus Bay, a bay in Washington
Cultus Lake (disambiguation)
Cultus River, a river in Oregon
Suzuki Cultus, model of an automobile